Nikolai Alekseyevich Slichenko (27 December 1934 — 2 July 2021) was a Soviet and Russian singer, actor and chief director of the Romen Theatre in Moscow. He was the only Romani person to be awarded the title People's Artist of the USSR (1981).

Biography
Nikolai was born in Belgorod area, Russia. Part of his childhood passed during World War II. During the war, Nikolai lost many relatives. In particular, when he was a boy, his father was shot before his eyes in 1942. After the war, the Slichenko family settled at a Romani collective farm in Voronezh Oblast. That was the time when Nikolai heard about a theater in Moscow and had dreamt of performing on its stage.

In 1951, Nikolai was accepted into the Romen Theatre. The gifted boy drew the attention of the leading theater masters. Certainly, they did not make it easy for him: he began like most, as an auxiliary staff actor.

Nikolai was first entrusted with a leading role as long ago as 1952, when he was not yet 18 years old. This was at the time when the theater left to Zagorsk (present-day Sergiyev Posad) with the play Four Fiancées by Ivan Khrustalev. Nikolai played the role of Leksa, as a substitute for the actor Sergey Fyodorovich Shishkov (of the Shishkov gypsy dynasty) who had become ill. He then played the role of Leksa for many years, and later, as he grew older, played the role of Badi in this play as well.

After the play Slichenko received attention as a capable actor. The theater began to engage him in the current repertoire plays. In all, at the time he played more than 60 roles in his native theater, and also took part in a number of popular films, including Under the Rain and the Sun, My Island Is Blue, Wedding in Malinovka and others.

In 1977, Nikolai Slichenko became the chief director of the Romen Theatre. For this, he completed the Higher Courses for Directors at the Russian Academy of Theatre Arts in 1972, under the management of the People's Artist of the USSR Andrey Goncharov.

On 4 December 1998, a star with Nikolai Slichenko's name was placed at the Star Square in Moscow.

Awards and honors
Orders
 Order "For Merit to the Fatherland" 2nd class (2020)
 Order "For Merit to the Fatherland" 3rd class (2004)
 Order "For Merit to the Fatherland" 4th class (1994)
 Order of Honour (2009) 
 Order of Friendship (2014)
 Order of Friendship of Peoples (1984)

Titles
 People's Artist of the USSR (1981)
People's Artist of the RSFSR (1975)
Honored Artist of the RSFSR (1969)

Awards
USSR State Prize (1987)
 Russian Federation Government Prize in the field of culture (2013)

References

External links
 
 
  
  Biography of Nikolai Slichenko
 

1934 births
2021 deaths
20th-century Russian male actors
People from Belgorod Oblast
Russian Academy of Theatre Arts alumni
Honored Artists of the RSFSR
People's Artists of the RSFSR
People's Artists of the USSR
Recipients of the Order "For Merit to the Fatherland", 2nd class
Recipients of the Order "For Merit to the Fatherland", 3rd class
Recipients of the Order "For Merit to the Fatherland", 4th class
Recipients of the Order of Friendship of Peoples
Recipients of the Order of Honour (Russia)
Recipients of the USSR State Prize
Romani male actors
Russian male film actors
Russian male stage actors
Russian Romani people
Russian theatre directors
Russian theatre managers and producers
Soviet male film actors
Soviet male stage actors
Soviet Romani people
Soviet theatre directors
Burials in Troyekurovskoye Cemetery